Battyna was an ancient town in Orestis, Upper Macedonia, near modern Kranochori village. The only decree of Battyna that has come down to us belongs to the Roman period (193 AD) and it is signed by 56 citizens. Alexander son of Leonidas, the politarch of Battyna, administers affairs regarding the land and property of the region, according to the diataxis (law) of a certain Gentianus (perhaps Decimus Terentius Gentianus, who was proconsul of Macedonia  117- 119 AD).

References

Greek text SEG 30.568
Macedonian institutions under the kings pages 	Pages 79–97  By Miltiadēs B. Hatzopoulos  

Populated places in ancient Macedonia
Orestis (region)
Former populated places in Greece